Benkt is a Swedish masculine given name. Notable people with the name include:

Benkt Austrin (1909–1974), Swedish sports shooter
Benkt-Åke Benktsson (1907–1957), Swedish film actor 
Benkt Norelius (1886–1974), Swedish gymnast

See also
Bent (surname)

Swedish masculine given names